Divizia Naţională 1992 is the first edition of Moldovan Divizia Naţională since independence.

The league was a double round-robin tournament. The season takes less than a year in order to change the league to become a summer league. Only 12 teams participate.

Teams

Final classification

Results

Top goalscorers
Updated to matches played on 12 April 2014.

5 goals 

  Serghei Cleșcenco (Zimbru Chișinău)
  Igor Yuminov (Tiligul Tiraspol)
  Andrei Stroenco (Tiligul Tiraspol)
  Alexey Luchiancikov (Tiligul Tiraspol)
  Vasili Baryshev (FC Tighina)
  Pavel Cebotari (Constructorul Chișinău)

4 goals 

  Radu Rebeja (Zimbru Chișinău)
  Eduard Lemeshko (Tiligul Tiraspol)
  Vadim Pocatilo (Bugeac Comrat)
  Alexandru Ciudac (Amocom Chișinău)
  Eugen Crivei (Amocom Chișinău)
  Ivan Ovcearenko (Amocom Chișinău)
  Ivan Tabanov (Bugeac Comrat(1) & Amocom Chișinău (3))
  Alexandru Avram (Constructorul Chișinău)
  Mihail Abianov (Dinamo Codru Chisinau)
  Vladimir Pikus (Dinamo Codru Chisinau)
  Veaceslav Shohirev (Speranța Nisporeni)
  Ilie Luziakin (FC Olimpia)
  Vlad Dijovski (Moldova Boroseni)
  Alexandru Stibelskii (Cristalul Făleşti)

3 goals 

  Alexandru Curtianu (Zimbru Chișinău)
  Serghei Dikarev (Tiligul Tiraspol)
  Alexei Scala (Bugeac Comrat)
  Victor Berco (Amocom Chișinău)
  Serghei Savchenko (Constructorul Chișinău)
  Vladislav Bogdaneț (Dinamo Codru Chisinau)
  Mihai Arteni (Speranța Nisporeni)
  Vlad Goian (FC Olimpia)
  Iurie Zatekliaev (FC Olimpia)
  Iurii Krysiko (Cristalul Făleşti)
  Andrei Ippolitov (Cristalul Făleşti)

2 goals 

  Serghei Chirilov (Zimbru Chișinău)
  Serghei Parhomenco (Zimbru Chișinău)
  Valeriu Pogorelov (Tiligul Tiraspol)
  Vladimir Gaidamașciuc (Bugeac Comrat)
  Alexandr Zaitsev (Bugeac Comrat)
  Iurie Scala (Bugeac Comrat)
  Vladimir Sereda (Bugeac Comrat)
  Mihail Nekoichev (Bugeac Comrat)
  Erik Okoko (FC Tighina)
  Vasilii Uzun (FC Tighina)
  Mihai Pavlov (FC Tighina)
  Ilya Iliushin (Amocom Chișinău)
  Valentin Spînu (Amocom Chișinău (1) & Constructorul Chișinău (3))
  Petru Efros (Constructorul Chișinău)
  Boris Pronevoi (Dinamo Codru Chisinau)
  Gheorghe Hora (Dinamo Codru Chisinau)
  Andrei Naumenko (Dinamo Codru Chisinau)
  Gheorghe Pîrciu (Speranța Nisporeni)
  Ivan Dolință (FC Olimpia)
  Oleg Ivancenko (Moldova Boroseni)
  Vlad Oboroc (Moldova Boroseni)
  Gheorghe Rotari (Cristalul Făleşti)

1 goal 

  Boris Cebotari (Zimbru Chișinău)
  Andrei Tîmbur (Zimbru Chișinău)
  Nikolai Vasiliev (Tiligul Tiraspol)
  Igor Oprea (Tiligul Tiraspol)
  Serghei Kabanov (Tiligul Tiraspol)
  Serghei Stroenco (Tiligul Tiraspol)
  Boris Crimus (Bugeac Comrat)
  Oleh Kylchik (Bugeac Comrat)
  Oleg Sirotiuk (Bugeac Comrat)
  Mihail Goptari (Bugeac Comrat)
  Alexandru Vyblov (Bugeac Comrat)
  Valeriu Catană (FC Tighina)
  Ilie Grudțin (FC Tighina)
  Alexei Crivoi (FC Tighina)
  Alexei Guzun (FC Tighina)
  Iurie Murzac (Amocom Chișinău)
  Vladimir Botezatu (Amocom Chișinău)
  Oleg Petrov (Amocom Chișinău)
  Ilia Tiunnikov (Amocom Chișinău)
  Radu Bulat (Amocom Chișinău)
  Iurie Kuchuk (Amocom Chișinău)
  Vladimir Gudev (Amocom Chișinău)
  Petru Sîrbu (Amocom Chișinău)
  Vladimir Shirokov (Constructorul Chișinău)
  Nicolae Jardan (Constructorul Chișinău)
  Andrei Plahetko (Dinamo Codru Chisinau)
  Andrei Colun (Dinamo Codru Chisinau)
  Sergiu Coșug (Speranța Nisporeni)
  Sergiu Macari (Speranța Nisporeni)
  Vlad Maximciuc (Speranța Nisporeni)
  Iurie Milicenco (FC Olimpia)
  Vlad Ghenaitis (FC Olimpia)
  Vlad Nozdrin (FC Olimpia)
  Gheorghe Fortuna (FC Olimpia)
  Serghei Filipcenko (FC Olimpia)
  Gheorghe Bojii (Moldova Boroseni)
  Mihai Andriuță (Moldova Boroseni)
  Sergiu Carabulea (Moldova Boroseni)
  Vlad Oboroc (Moldova Boroseni)
  Sergiu Crivițchii (Cristalul Făleşti)
  Oleg Cucoș (Cristalul Făleşti)
  Iurie Fuior (Cristalul Făleşti)
  Iurie Andrițchii (Cristalul Făleşti)
  Gheorghe Tupiciko (Cristalul Făleşti)
  Iurie Smedu (Constructorul Leova)
  Gheorghe Zacon (Constructorul Leova)
  Iurie Trofim (Constructorul Leova)
  Vitalie Podlesnyi (Constructorul Leova)

External links
RSSSF

Moldovan Super Liga seasons
1
Moldova